Ebrahimabad (also Romanized as Ebrāhīmābād; also known as Akrūbi) is a village in Yam Rural District, Meshkan District, Khoshab County, Razavi Khorasan Province, Iran. At the 2006 census, its population was 62, in 20 families.

References 

Populated places in Khoshab County